Corallus grenadensis, also known as the Grenada tree boa or Grenada Bank tree boa, is a boa species found in Grenada. No subspecies are currently recognized. Like all other boas, it is not venomous.

Description
A species with a variable color pattern, it is found in a wide range of habitats, but is mainly encountered in drier scrublands and wet rainforests. Rarely found in captivity.

Geographic range
Found in the Grenadines, including Bequia Island, Ile Quatre, Baliceaux, Mustique, Canouan, Mayreau, Union Island and Carriacou and Grenada. The type locality given is "St. George's, Grenada."

References

External Links
 iNaturalist page

grenadensis
Snakes of the Caribbean
Endemic fauna of Grenada
Taxa named by Thomas Barbour
Reptiles described in 1914